The Will Reed Farm House is a historic farmhouse on Main Street in Alleene, Arkansas.

Description and history 
It is a single-story dog trot log structure, built  by J. D. Abney. In 1902 it was bought by Will Reed, who lived there for fifty years. The house is now owned by the Little River County Historical Society, which operates it as a historical museum.

The house was listed on the National Register of Historic Places in 1978.

See also
National Register of Historic Places listings in Little River County, Arkansas

References

External links
 Will Reed Farm House - Arkansas Tourism

Houses on the National Register of Historic Places in Arkansas
Houses completed in 1895
Museums in Little River County, Arkansas
History museums in Arkansas
Houses in Little River County, Arkansas
National Register of Historic Places in Little River County, Arkansas